Update is the second studio album by Chinese singer Jane Zhang, released on August 2, 2007 by Huayi Brothers.

Track listing 
 Help Out (3:43)
 Dream Party (3:46)
 Love That Can't Be Given (4:04)
 Sunset Boulevard (3:50)
 We Are Together (3:13)
 A Promise (4:31)
 Sorrowful G Major (4:36)
 Yalta (4:30)
 Your Song (4:06)
 Expiration Date (4:32)

References 

2007 albums
Jane Zhang albums